Attorney General Black may refer to:

Arthur Black (Unionist politician) (1888–1968), Attorney General for Northern Ireland
Jeremiah S. Black (1810–1883), Attorney General of the United States

See also
General Black (disambiguation)